HMS Hornet was an Acheron-class destroyer of the Royal Navy that served during the First World War and was sold for breaking in 1921. She was the seventh Royal Navy ship to be named Hornet, after the insect.

Construction
She was built under the 1910-11 shipbuilding programme by John Brown & Company of Clydebank, Glasgow. She (and her sister ships  and ) differed from the standard Admiralty I-class destroyer in only having two shafts instead of three. They had two Brown-Curtis type steam turbines, and twin boilers. She was launched on 20 December 1911.

Pennant Numbers

Career

Pre-War
Hornet served with the First Destroyer Flotilla from 1911 and, with her flotilla, joined the British Grand Fleet in 1914 on the outbreak of the First World War.

The Battle of Dogger Bank
On 24 January 1915, the First Destroyer Flotilla — including Hornet — were present at the Battle of Dogger Bank, led by the light cruiser . Her crew shared in the prize money for the German armoured cruiser .

Grounding of Argyll
The light cruiser  went aground on Bell Rock near Dundee on 28 October after failing to sight the light due to a failure of communications between the ship and the lighthouse.

Transfer to Third Battle Squadron
Hornet was not present with her flotilla at the Battle of Jutland on 31 May 1916.
She was one of seven went with the First Destroyer Flotilla when it was transferred from the Grand Fleet to screen the Third Battle Squadron in November 1916.

Mediterranean Service
In 1917, the Third Battle Squadron was sent to the Mediterranean, where they took part in the 1918 Naval campaign in the Adriatic, including enforcing the Otranto Barrage.

Jackal and Hornet encountered the Austro-Hungarian ships and turned towards, making the challenge signal. At a range of  the Austro-Hungarian destroyers opened fire, concentrating their fire on Hornet. Both British ships turned away, making smoke, with the intention of drawing the enemy south, but Hornet took a hit in the forward shell room and magazine, starting fires in both compartments and causing an explosion. The bridge and tiller flat both received further hits, and the rudder jammed hard over to starboard, leaving the ship circling hard under fire. Jackal turned to the east, but after approximately 15 minutes of firing, Herkner in Triglav broke off the engagement, reasoning that the alarm had certainly been raised. Jackal continued the pursuit, but the faster Austro-Hungarians pulled ahead, and she lost sight of them by 00:20. Alarm, Torrens and Cimeterre had caught up with Jackal by 00:45, but by 01:35 the pursuit was called off.

Hornet was seriously damaged, and Jackal had lost her mainmast, but the appearance of Allied reinforcements had driven the Austrians back to Cattaro (now Kotor in Montenegro). The British lost six killed (four of them in Hornet) and 25 wounded, while the Austro-Hungarians suffered no hits. Despite the one-sided casualty figures, two pre-war Royal Navy destroyers had succeeded in driving off five of the latest enemy destroyers.

Hornet was present at the entry of the Allied Fleet through the Dardanelles on 12 November. The Fleet sighted the minarets of Constantinople at 07:00 on 13 November and anchored an hour later. The destroyers maintained an anti-submarine patrol to the west of the anchored fleet.

Disposal
Along with most ships of her class, she was laid up after the war, and on 9 May 1921 she was sold to Ward of Rainham for breaking.

References

External links
 

Acheron-class destroyers of the Royal Navy
Ships built on the River Clyde
1911 ships
World War I destroyers of the United Kingdom